In the early Middle Ages, a  (Latin for "plea") was a public judicial assembly.  origins can be traced to military gatherings in the Frankish kingdoms in the seventh century. After the Frankish conquest of Italy in 774,  were introduced before the end of the eighth century. Also known as "Marchfields" or "Mayfields" (based on the month of the gathering), early meetings were used as planning sessions for military expeditions.

The nature of these assemblies is described by the ninth-century prelate Hincmar in his . All free men were required to attend and those who did not were fined. Eventually, because the counts, their deputies (the viscounts) and the centenars abused their power to summon in order to profit from the fines, men were required to attend no more than three  a year.

The public  declined in the tenth and eleventh centuries as the process of "feudalization" turned formerly public offices into seignorial jurisdictions.

Notes

Further reading
Wendy Davies and Paul Fouracre (eds.), The Settlement of Disputes in Early Medieval Europe (Cambridge, 1992).

Francia
Popular assemblies
Medieval politics